Swat or SWAT may refer to:

Places
 Swat (princely state), a former princely state in the present-day Swat and other surrounding districts
 Swat District, a district in the Khyber Pakhtunkhwa province, Pakistan
 Swat River, a river in the Khyber Pakhtunkhwa province of Pakistan
 Somerset West and Taunton, a district in England

Film and television
 S.W.A.T. (1975 TV series), an American action crime series about a SWAT team
 S.W.A.T. (film), a 2003 film based on the series
 S.W.A.T. (soundtrack), the film's soundtrack album
 S.W.A.T.: Firefight, a 2011 direct-to-video sequel to the film
 S.W.A.T.: Under Siege, a third film in the series, released direct-to-video in 2017
 S.W.A.T. (2017 TV series), a series based on the 1975 television series and 2003 feature film

Video games
 SWAT, a 1984 arcade game developed by Coreland
 Police Quest or SWAT, a series of police simulation video games:
 Police Quest: SWAT
 Police Quest: SWAT 2
 SWAT 3: Close Quarters Battle
 SWAT: Global Strike Team
 SWAT 4
 SWAT Force
 SWAT: Target Liberty
 SWAT Elite Troops

Other uses
 Swat, to bat away a nuisance, as with a fly swatter
 Block (basketball) or swat, a defensive play
 SWAT (special weapons and tactics), a paramilitary unit of law-enforcement agencies
 SWAT (Bangladesh), a tactical unit of the Dhaka Metropolitan Police, Bangladesh
 Beijing SWAT, a tactical unit of the Beijing Police, China
 SWAT (magazine), an American firearms and law enforcement monthly
 Samba Web Administration Tool (SWAT)
 SWAT model (Soil & Water Assessment Tool), a river basin scale model

See also
 Akhund of Swat, a prominent religious Mullah or priest, and Emir of the former Yusufzai State of Swat
 Swatting, a hoax intended to provoke a response from SWAT or other emergency personnel

 
 
 
 SWATS (Southwest Atlanta, too strong), a hiphop group
 Swot (disambiguation)
 Swati (disambiguation)